The Dils–Downer House is a historic building located on the eastside of Davenport, Iowa, United States. The Shingle Style Bungalow has been listed on the National Register of Historic Places since 1983.

History
The house was built in 1898 by Thomas M. Dils, who was a local contractor and builder. He died in 1902 and his wife sold the house to Harry and Alice Downer. He worked as a school teacher and principal before he became a settlement house worker. Downer is most noteworthy for his two-volume historical work, History of Davenport and Scott County, Iowa. He resided in this house when he prepared and published the work in 1910.

Architecture
The 1½-story structure is a side-gable Craftsman cottage with a long side wing. It features two dormers built in the Shingle Style. Many of the windows also feature diamond-shaped lights.

References

Houses completed in 1898
Shingle Style architecture in Iowa
Bungalow architecture in Iowa
Houses in Davenport, Iowa
Houses on the National Register of Historic Places in Iowa
National Register of Historic Places in Davenport, Iowa